Oleksii Kovalchuk (born 18 September 1989) is a professional poker player from Ukraine who won the 2011 World Series of Poker $2,500 No Limit Hold'em Six Handed event, earning $689,739 and also winning the 2012 World Series of Poker $2,500 Omaha/Seven Card Stud Hi/Lo event, earning $228,014. Kovalchuk is the only Ukrainian to have won multiple World Series of Poker bracelets.

As of 2012, his total live tournament winnings exceed $2,100,000. His 7 cashes at the World Series of Poker account for $976,420 of those winnings.

World Series of Poker bracelets

References

1989 births
Living people
World Series of Poker bracelet winners
Ukrainian poker players